Thursday Afternoon is the tenth solo studio album by British ambient musician Brian Eno consisting of one 60-minute eponymous composition. It is the rearranged soundtrack to an 80-minute video production of the same title made in 1984.

Background 

Since recording Discreet Music in 1975, Eno had shown a strong interest in creating music that can influence the atmosphere of the space in which it is played, rather than be focused on directly. The Thursday Afternoon video was conceived as a series of seven "video paintings" which can be looked at in passing without demanding full attention from the viewer. Each of the segments depicts simple imagery that has been treated with visual effects, much in the same way as Eno's music is often made up of simple instrumental performances that have been treated with audio effects. The work was filmed on a Thursday afternoon and named as such.

Thursday Afternoon consists of multiple tracks of processed piano and electronic textures. The layers of the composition are phased so that their relationships to each other are constantly changing in a way similar to his previous Discreet Music piece. The album was also one of the first to take advantage of the (then new) extended running time of the compact disc format, containing only one 60-min track.

Music 

At just one track lasting 60 minutes, the music is ambient: beatless, flowing and ethereal. Remixing and rearranging from the soundtrack to suit the CD medium, Eno stated: "... the music wasn't recorded digitally. It was recorded on a 24-track analogue machine, and then digitally mastered."

An acoustic piano plays a series of notes and simple chords against a background of synths, which eventually dominate the entire soundscape. Though the composition sounds "static", in the sense that its length makes it seem like a solid "lump" of sound, it features many unstable elements that change in both timbre and volume over its entirety.

Video 

The original video, made at the request of and released by the Sony Corporation of America, was filmed in San Francisco in April 1984 and treated and assembled at Sony in Tokyo. Produced by Brian Eno and Daniel Lanois, it features seven "video paintings" of actress and photographer Christine Alicino, a friend of Eno's, and has a running time of 82 minutes. It was filmed in "vertical format," which necessitated the viewer either lie on their side or turn the television on its side, which often proved impractical for many viewers, and it most affected the picture tube's color purity adjustments. The DVD reissue presents it in both portrait and landscape formats so that this is no longer necessary.

The content is a series of images that stay static for some time and then slowly move forward, often to pause again. Various video techniques were implemented, such as image feedback, to create a very different interpretation of video and the nude.

Eno himself was aware of the newness of what he was doing. "I was delighted to find this other way of using video because at last here's video which draws from another source, which is painting ... I call them "video paintings" because if you say to people "I make videos", they think of Sting's new rock video or some really boring, grimy "Video Art". It's just a way of saying "I make videos that don't move very fast"."

The soundtrack was recorded at Dan Lanois's studio in Canada and is a longer, different mix.

Music track listing 
 "Thursday Afternoon" (60:56)

Personnel
 Brian Eno - performance, mixing, assembly, production
Michael Brook - mixing, assembly
Andrew Day - redesign
Roger Eno - performance, production
Nigel Gayler - engineering
Simon Heyworth - mastering
Tim Hunt - engineering
Daniel Lanois - mixing, engineering, production
Russell Mills - artwork, art direction, design
Carlos Olms - digital consultant
Tom Phillips - cover art
Alex Roggero - photography

Versions

Video
 Released on VHS; Beta (NTSC, cat# 2929); Laser disc; Videodisc (probably bootleg)
 Japan: Sony, OOZM 70 (VHS) / OOQM 70 (Beta)
 UK: Hendring, Hen 2 133 (VHS)
 Germany: Video Edition Markgraph, VEM 101 (VHS)

DVD
The video has been repackaged with Eno's 47-minute ambient video "Mistaken Memories of Mediaeval Manhattan" (1981) as 14 Video Paintings (Hannibal Records, 2005/2006, HNDVD 1508) (Region 1 NTSC, Region 2 PAL).

Music

References

External links 

 
 Liner notes from Thursday Afternoon
 Inlay notes from Thursday Afternoon
 Hyperreal article on Eno's video artworks
 2 of Eno's sketchbooks. On the left is a 1982 "repetition schema" for T.A., and on the right is a sketch of the mix for U2's Unforgettable Fire
 Interview; Electronics & Music Maker, December 1985
 Observer article; Feb.23 1986
 Disquiet transcript of an online discussion, 2005
 
 PopMatters review of 14 Video Paintings 
 Prefix mag review of 14 Video Paintings 
 Creem mag review of 14 Video Paintings
 Christine Alicino's homepage

1985 albums
Ambient albums by English artists
Albums produced by Brian Eno
Albums produced by Daniel Lanois
Brian Eno albums
E.G. Records albums
Vertical video